This is a list of Uzbek football transfers for the 2012–13 winter and 2013 summer transfer window. Only transfers of the 2013 Uzbek League and First League are provided. Start of the season was March 2013.

Winter 2012–13

By date

By team

FK Buxoro

In:

Out:

Bunyodkor

In:

Out:

FK Guliston

In:

 
 
 
 

Out:

FK Dinamo Samarqand

In:

 
 
 

 
 
 
 

Out:

Lokomotiv Tashkent

In:

 
 
  
 
 
 
 
 
 
 

Out:

Metallurg Bekabad

In:

 
 
 

Out:

Navbahor Namangan

In:

 
 

 
 

Out:

Nasaf Qarshi

In:

 
 
 
 
 
 

 
 

Out:

Neftchi Farg'ona

In:

Out:

Olmaliq FK

In:

 

 
 
 
 
 
 
 
 

Out:

Pakhtakor

In:

 
 

  

  

  
  
  
 
 

Out:

Qizilqum Zarafshon

In:

 

 

 
 

Out:

Sogdiana Jizzakh

In:

 
 
 
 
 
 
 
 
 
 
 

Out:

Shurtan Guzar

In:

 
 
 
 
 
 
 

 
 
 

Out:

First League

FK Andijan

In:

Out:

Mash'al Mubarek

In:

Out:

Oqtepa Toshkent

In:

 

Out:

Zarafshon Navoi

In:

Out:

Summer 2013

By date

See also
2013 Uzbek League
List of Uzbek football transfers 2010
List of Uzbek football transfers 2011
List of Uzbek football transfers 2012

References

External links 
 Uzbekistan Professional Football League
 Uzbekistan PFL Squads 2013, I
 Uzbekistan PFL Squads 2013, II
 Uzbek League 2012-13 winter transfers
 Uzbekistan PFL Summer 2013 Transfers

Sport in Tashkent
Transfers
Uzbek
Uzbek
2013